Listner Pierre-Louis (born 31 January 1989) is a professional footballer who plays as a midfielder for Championnat National 2 club Rumilly-Vallières. Born in France, he is a former Haiti international.

References

1989 births
Living people
Association football midfielders
French footballers
Haitian footballers
French sportspeople of Haitian descent
Black French sportspeople
Vannes OC players
SA Thiers players
Le Puy Foot 43 Auvergne players
Jura Sud Foot players
Bourges Foot players
GFA Rumilly-Vallières players
Haiti international footballers

Ligue 2 players
Championnat National players
Championnat National 3 players
Championnat National 2 players